Obulareddypeta (or Obul Reddy Peta) is a village in a Chapadu mandal in Kadapa district in the Indian state of Andhra Pradesh.

References

Villages in Kadapa district